Isocyanide dichlorides are organic compounds containing the RN=CCl2 functional group.  Classically they are obtained by chlorination of isocyanides.  Phenylcarbylamine chloride is a well-characterized example.

Preparation and reactions
Chlorination of organic isothiocyanates is also well established: 
RN=C=S  +  2Cl2  →  RN=CCl2  +  SCl2
Alkylisocyanates are chlorinated by phosphorus pentachloride:
RN=C=O  +  PCl5  →  RN=CCl2  +  POCl3

Cyanogen chloride also chlorinates to give the isocyanide dichloride:
ClCN  +  Cl2  →  ClN=CCl2

Reactions
Isocyanide dichlorides participate in Friedel-Crafts-like reactions, leading, after hydrolysis, to benzamides:
RN=CCl2  +  ArH  →  RN=C(Cl)Ar +  HCl
RN=C(Cl)Ar +  H2O  →  R(H)NC(O)Ar  + HCl

References

Functional groups
Isocyanides
Organochlorides